The 5th Separate Mechanized Brigade was a formation of the Ukrainian Ground Forces sent to Iraq in August 2003. Brigade was deployed from 17 August 2003 to March 2004.

Mission objectives

Maintain stability and safety in Wasit Governorate
Reconnaissance and destruction of terrorist and organized crime groups, detainment and court judgment of military criminals
Provide support for Coalition Provisional Authority in reconstruction of civil departments
Provide help with development of judicial system, which supports the rights of all Iraqi residents, and provides inner security
Provide support together with other organizations in rebuilding of schooling, medical, electrical and water systems, industrial complexes, creation of new work places
Form and train a battalion of Iraqi Civil Defense Corps (ICDC)
Form and train 3 battalions for the Department of Border enforcement (DBE)

Operations
Operation Chamberlain

Brigade Order of Battle
51st Separate Mechanized Battalion
52nd Separate Mechanized Battalion
19th Separate Specialized Battalion

Dislocation

Casualties
Sgt. Yuriy Koydan – Died of injuries suffered when his BRDM-2 armored reconnaissance vehicle overturned while patrolling an air base near Al Kūt in southern Iraq on 30 September 2003
Private Sergiy Suslov – Died from a non-combat related injury.
Captain Oleksii Bondarenko – Committed suicide by shooting himself in Al Kūt, Iraq, on 19 November 2003

Next rotation
 6th Separate Mechanized Brigade

References

Mechanised infantry brigades of Ukraine
Military units and formations established in 2003
Multinational force involved in the Iraq War
Military units and formations disestablished in 2004